Susumanioidea is an extinct superfamily of Phasmatodea, known from the Middle Jurassic to Eocene. They lie outside the modern crown group of Phasmatodea. Members of the group typically possess large, fully developed wings.

Taxonomy 
According to Yang et al. 2021.

†subfamily Phasmomimoidinae Gorochov 1988
 †Phasmomimoides Sharov 1968 5 species, Karabastau Formation, Kazakhstan, Callovian-Oxfordian, Zaza Formation, Russian, Aptian
 †subfamily Aclistophasmatinae Yang et al. 2021
 †Aclistophasma Yang et al. 2021 Jiulongshan Formation (Daohugou Beds), China, Callovian
 †Adjacivena Shang et al. 2011 Daohugou Beds, China, Callovian
 †subfamily Susumaniinae Gorochov 1988
 †Aethephasma Ren 1997 Yixian Formation, China, Aptian
 †Coniphasma Birket-Smith 1981 Umivik locality, Greenland, Coniacian
 †Cretophasmomima Kuzmina 1985 Weald Clay, England, Barremian, Yixian Formation, China, Aptian Zaza Formation, Russia, Aptian, Ola Formation. Arkagalinskaya Formation, Russia, Campanian
 †Cretophasmomimoides Gorochov 1988 Anda-Khuduk Formation, Mongolia, Aptian
 †Eoprephasma Archibald and Bradler 2015 Klondike Mountain Formation, United States, Ypresian
 †Eosusumania Gorochov 1988 Emanra Formation, Russia, Turonian
 †Hagiphasma Ren 1997 Yixian Formation, China, Aptian
 †Kolymoptera Gorochov 1988 Arkagalinskaya Formation, Russia, Campanian
 †Orephasma Ren 1997 Yixian Formation, China, Aptian
 †Palaeopteron Rice 1969 Redmond Formation, Canada, Cenomanian
 †Paraphasmomimella Kuzmina 1985 Zaza Formation, Russia, Aptian Emanra Formation, Russia, Turonian
 †Phasmomimella Kevan and Wighton 1981 Crato Formation, Brazil, Aptian, Zaza Formation, Russia, Aptian, Paskapoo Formation, Canada, Paleocene
 †Phasmomimula Kevan and Wighton 1981 Paskapoo Formation, Canada, Paleocene
 †Promastacoides Kevan and Wighton 1981 Paskapoo Formation, Canada, Paleocene
 †Prosusumania Gorochov 1988 Argun Formation, Russia, Aptian
 †Renphasma Nel and Delfosse 2011 Yixian Formation, China, Aptian
 †Susumania Gorochov 1988 Arkagalinskaya Formation, Russia, Campanian

References 

Phasmatodea
Insect superfamilies
Prehistoric insects